Thomas Worton (1876–unknown) was an English footballer who played in the Football League for West Bromwich Albion and Wolverhampton Wanderers.

References

1876 births
Date of death unknown
English footballers
Association football forwards
English Football League players
Wolverhampton Wanderers F.C. players
West Bromwich Albion F.C. players